Soma dynasty was a Hindu dynasty that ruled the present-day Kathmandu Valley, in central Nepal. 

It was founded by Nimistakar Barma (sometimes referred to as Nimish I) in 205 CE, after the fall of the Kirata Kingdom. In 305, the dynasty was succeeded by the Licchavi dynasty.

References

Citations

Bibliography 

 
 
 
 
 

3rd-century establishments in Nepal
4th-century disestablishments
Ancient Nepal
Archaeology of Nepal
Dynasties of Nepal